Wild Health Field is a ballpark in Lexington, Kentucky.  It is primarily used for baseball, and is the home field of the Lexington Counter Clocks (formerly the Legends) of the Atlantic League of Professional Baseball, an official Partner League of Major League Baseball.  It was built in 2001. It holds 6,994 people.  From 2001 until 2010, the stadium was named Applebee's Park.  In January 2011, it was announced that the naming rights to the stadium had been bought by Whitaker Bank Corporation, and the stadium was renamed Whitaker Bank Ballpark. The deal ended in 2021.

In February 2022, the Legends announced that the stadium would be renamed Wild Health Field following a new naming rights agreement with Wild Health, a Lexington-based health clinic specializing in genomics-based precision medicine and wellness.

Features
Wild Health Field is modeled after larger minor-league and major-league stadiums.  It features the "Pepsi Party Deck" over the right field wall.  This area is available to rent by groups.  Along the first base line is the "Budweiser Stables," where fans can order beer and watch a game from an area of picnic tables.  Behind home plate and accessible from the stadium's main entrance, the "Kentucky Ale Taproom" restaurant caters to members and guests with passes.  The third base line features a small but popular area for families to watch the games. This area includes a kids area with a playground, bouncer and obstacle course. The bleachers, behind left field, holds more fans. There are two videoboards and one manual out-of-town scoreboard. The ballpark contains 785 club seats and 24 luxury suites.

The stadium's largest crowd to date came on June 6, 2006, when a standing-room-only crowd of over 9,300 was on hand to witness what the team dubbed "Rocket Relaunch" — Roger Clemens's first stop on his return to the Houston Astros.

Ballpark firsts
Game: April 9, 2001 (7:16 p.m. EST)
Attendance: 8,037

Gallery

References

External links
Lexington Legends official website

Minor league baseball venues
Sports venues in Lexington, Kentucky
Sports venues completed in 2001
2001 establishments in Kentucky
Baseball venues in Kentucky